is a passenger railway station in located in the town of  Taki, Taki District, Mie Prefecture, Japan, operated by Central Japan Railway Company (JR Tōkai).

Lines
Tokida Station is served by the Kisei Main Line, and is located 3.3 rail kilometers from the terminus of the line at Taki Station.

Station layout
The station consists of one side platform serving bi-directional traffic. There is no station building, and the station is unattended.

Platforms

Adjacent stations

|-

History
Tokida Station opened on January 24, 1963 as a station on the Japan National Railways (JNR) Sangū Line. The station was absorbed into the JR Central network upon the privatization of the JNR on April 1, 1987.

Passenger statistics
In fiscal 2019, the station was used by an average of 109 passengers daily (boarding passengers only).

Surrounding area
Mifune Shrine / Muyano Shrine
Kano Shrine / Kano Gozen Shrine
Kuchira Shrine
Sugihara Shrine

See also
List of railway stations in Japan

References

External links

Railway stations in Japan opened in 1963
Railway stations in Mie Prefecture
Taki, Mie